Pierrepoint may refer to:

 Albert Pierrepoint (1905–1992), British executioner
 Henry Pierrepoint (1878–1922), British executioner, father of Albert
 Thomas Pierrepoint (1870–1954), British executioner, brother of Henry
 Pierrepoint (film), British 2005 film about Albert Pierrepoint

See also
Pierpoint (disambiguation)
Pierrepont (disambiguation)